The Faculty of Veterinary and Agricultural Sciences (FVAS) is a faculty of the University of Melbourne. The faculty is a medium for undergraduate education and academic research into economically and medically important fields related to agriculture and veterinary science, such as agronomy, biosecurity, environment, food security, food science, parasitology, pest control, veterinary virology, zoonotic diseases, etc.

Organisation
The faculty is structured as follows:

 Faculty of Veterinary and Agricultural Sciences – Dean: Prof. John Fazakerley

 Melbourne Veterinary School – Head of school: Prof. Anna Louise Meredith OBE FRCVS

 Research centres: Animal Welfare Science Centre, Asia-Pacific Centre for Animal Health, Centre for Animal Biotechnology, Centre for Equine Infectious Disease, Mackinnon Project, OIE Collaborating Centre for Diagnostic Test Validation Science in the Asia-Pacific Region, Poultry CRC

 School of Agriculture and Food – Head of school: Prof. Herbert Kronzucker

 Research centres: Healthy Soils for Sustainable Food Production and Environmental Quality, Primary Industries Climate Challenges Centre, Unlocking the Food Value Chain

History of organisation
The Melbourne School of Land and Environment was disestablished on 1January 2015. Its agriculture and food systems department moved alongside veterinary science to form the Faculty of Veterinary and Agricultural Sciences, while other areas of study, including horticulture, forestry, geography and resource management, moved to the Faculty of Science in two new departments. Previous constituent entities include the Faculty of Agriculture, Forestry and Horticulture (1995), Institute of Land and Food Resources (1997), Faculty of Land & Food Resources (2005) and School of Agriculture and Food Systems (in the Melbourne School of Land and Environment).

Facilities

The faculty operates through the following facilities:

 Building 122 (a.k.a. Bisciences 2; Agriculture and Food), on Royal Parade, at the far-western edge of the Parkville campus, Melbourne – Faculty administration, study areas for students
 Building 400 (Veterinary Preclinical Sciences), on Flemington Road, part of the Western Precinct, an exclave of Parkville campus, together with the Bio21 Institute and the Walter and Eliza Hall Institute of Medical Research – Research
 Building 438 (Werribee Demountable Consult), Werribee campus, Melbourne – A veterinary hospital and the Veterinary Science Library Werribee are located here. The latter generally collects in the areas of surgery, pathology and parasitology. Services offered at the library include borrowing, membership, renewals, inter-library loans, inter-campus loans, BONUS+ borrowing scheme, and printing and scanning.
 The Dookie campus

Student engagement

Courses
The faculty offers the following courses:

 Agricultural science

 Bachelor of Agriculture*
 Bachelor of Agriculture (Honours)
 Honours in Agricultural Science (Bachelor of Science)
 Honours in Animal Science and Management (Bachelor of Science)
 Graduate Certificate in Agricultural Sciences
 Graduate Certificate in Climate Change for Primary Industries
 Graduate Diploma in Agricultural Sciences
 Master of Agricultural Sciences
 Master of Philosophy
 Doctor of Philosophy (Agricultural Sciences)

 Veterinary science

 Honours in Veterinary Bioscience (Bachelor of Science)
 Graduate Certificate in Small Animal Emergency and Critical Care
 Graduate Certificate in Small Animal Ultrasound (Abdominal)
 Graduate Certificate in Veterinary Public Health
 Graduate Diploma in Agribusiness for Veterinarians
 Graduate Diploma in Veterinary Professional Leadership and Management
 Graduate Diploma in Veterinary Public Health
 Clinical Masters Residency Program
 Master of Philosophy (Veterinary Science)
 Master of Veterinary Public Health
 Master of Veterinary Science
 Master of Veterinary Studies
 Doctor of Philosophy (Veterinary Science)
 Doctor of Veterinary Medicine*

 Food science

 Honours in Food Science (Bachelor of Science)
 Graduate Certificate in Food Science
 Graduate Diploma in Food Science
 Master of Food and Packaging Innovation
 Master of Food Science

 General studies

 Diploma in General Studies

(*) The faculty requires all students undertaking at least these courses to be vaccinated for the zoonotic bacterium Coxiella burnetii, the causal agent of Q fever.

Societies
Several student societies exist to foster cohesion among students in the faculty:

 Agricultural and Food Sciences Society
 Veterinary Students Society of Victoria
 Graduate student association
 Agrifoodies
 Animal Welfare Science Students of The UoM
 Postgraduates at Werribee (PAWS)
 Postgraduates of Veterinary Science (POVS)

Rankings
The Academic Ranking of World Universities (ARWU) has produced and annual rank, since 2017, of universities according to subject area in the Global Ranking of Academic Subjects. The table below summarises the rankings of the University of Melbourne in the subjects of 'Agriculture' and 'Veterinary Sciences', in comparison to all universities and Australian universities only. Since 2018, the University of Melbourne Department of Veterinary Biosciences has ranked second in Australia in Veterinary Sciences, behind the University of Sydney School of Veterinary Science.

See also

 Related topics
 Agriculture in Australia
 Agricultural education (list of providers)
 Veterinary education (list of providers)
 Related faculties of the University of Melbourne
 University of Melbourne Faculty of Science
 University of Melbourne Faculty of Medicine, Dentistry and Health Sciences
 Pre-2015 University of Melbourne veterinary and agricultural academics
 Arthur William Turner OBE DVSc DSc FAA (1900–1989)
 Harold Addison Woodruff (1877–1966)
 Nancy Atkinson OBE (1910–1999)

References

External links
 Official website

Veterinary and Agricultural Science